The Dropout is an American podcast hosted by Rebecca Jarvis that follows the story of Elizabeth Holmes and Theranos. It was produced by ABC News, Taylor Dunn, Victoria Thompson, and Rebecca Jarvis. Following the podcast, a two-hour 20/20 episode premiered in March 2019, following the popularity of the podcast, and was nominated for a news Emmy Award in the Outstanding Feature Story in a Newsmagazine category. The podcast has been adapted to a limited series of the same name starring Oscar-nominee Amanda Seyfried as Holmes. Jarvis, Dunn, and Thompson served as executive producers along with showrunner Elizabeth Meriwether.

Background
Holmes dropped out of Stanford University and founded Theranos, a medical technology company, in 2003 and became the world's youngest female self-made billionaire.  The company was valued at approximately $9 billion. The company claimed that it could complete a full range of blood tests with a single drop of blood, testing for hundreds of diseases. Theranos sold its blood-testing technology to Walgreens. The U.S. Securities and Exchange Commission later charged Holmes with defrauding investors. Holmes was indicted in June 2018 on 11 counts of felony fraud. The podcast interviews former employees, investors, and patients and includes portions of deposition tapes.

Episodes

Awards
Podcast of the Year, iHeartRadio Podcast Awards (2020)
Edward R. Murrow Podcast of The Year, 2020
Front Page Award for In-Depth Radio Reporting, 2019

See also
 The Dropout (miniseries)
 List of American crime podcasts
 List of podcast adaptations

References

External links 
 

2019 podcast debuts
American podcasts
Audio podcasts
Crime podcasts
Infotainment
Investigative journalism
Podcasts adapted into television shows